Sancoins is a commune in the Cher department in the Centre-Val de Loire region of France.

Geography
The commune shares its southern border with that of the department of Allier.

Population

Sights
 The church of St. Martin, rebuilt in the nineteenth century.
 The fourteenth-century castle of Jouy, built by Pierre de Giac, chancellor of the Duke of Berry.
 Several 15th and sixteenth-century buildings in the main town.
 Javoulet lake.
 The sixteenth-century ‘Joan of Arc’ tower.

Personalities
Oscar Méténier (1859–1913), writer, was born here.
Marguerite Audoux (1863–1937), writer, was born here.

See also
Communes of the Cher department

References

External links

Sancoins website 
Annuaire Mairie website 

Communes of Cher (department)
Bourbonnais